Carl Ekdahl from the Los Alamos National Laboratory was named Fellow of the Institute of Electrical and Electronics Engineers (IEEE) in 2015 for contributions to high-power accelerator development and the generation and transport of electron beams for flash-radiography.

References 

Fellow Members of the IEEE
Living people
Year of birth missing (living people)
Place of birth missing (living people)
American electrical engineers